Fortenberry may refer to:

 Brandon Fortenberry (born 1990), American professional basketball player
 Hoyt Fortenberry, fictional character
 Jeff Fortenberry (born 1960), American politician
 Joe Fortenberry (1911–1993), American basketball player
 John Fortenberry, film and television director
 Ken Fortenberry, journalist

See also
 Fortenberry Glacier
 Hendrick Jacobs Falkenberg, ancestor of most members of American Fortenberry family
 Nash-Fortenberry UFO sighting